The Lossuk is a river of north-western New Ireland, Papua New Guinea. The sedimentation and mineral deposits of the river was studied in the mid 1980s.

References

Rivers of New Ireland Province